Wickham may refer to:

Places

Australia
 Wickham, New South Wales, a suburb of Newcastle
 Wickham, Northern Territory, a locality
 Wickham, Western Australia, a town
 Wickham River, an ephemeral river in the Northern Territory

Canada
 Wickham Parish, New Brunswick
 Wickham, New Brunswick, an unincorporated community therein
 Wickham, Quebec

England
 Wickham, Berkshire
 Wickham, Hampshire
 Wickham Bishops, Essex
 Wickham Market, Suffolk
 Wickham Skeith, Suffolk
 Wickham St. Paul, Essex
 East Wickham, south-east London
 West Wickham, Cambridgeshire
 West Wickham, south-east London

Other Places
 Wickham, West Virginia, in Raleigh County, U.S.
 Wickham, Hampshire County, West Virginia
 Wickham Island (disambiguation)

People

Characters
 Bobbie Wickham, in P. G. Wodehouse's Jeeves stories
 George Wickham, principal villain in Jane Austen's 1813 novel Pride and Prejudice
 William Wickham, recurring character of Poldark fifth season

Given name
 Wickham Skinner, professor at the Harvard Business School

Surname
 Anna Wickham (1884–1947), pseudonym of Edith Mary Harper, English poet
 Archie Wickham (1855–1935), first-class cricketer who played for Somerset County Cricket Club from 1891 to 1907
 Charles Wickham (disambiguation)
 Charles Wickham (police officer) (1879–1971), commander of the Royal Ulster Constabulary (1922–1945)
 Charles Preston Wickham (1836–1925), American congressman from Ohio
 Christopher Wickham (born 1950), Chichele Professor of Medieval History at Oxford
 Connor Wickham (born 1993), English footballer
 David Wickham (born 1966), British Pianist, Conductor and Music Director 
 Edward Wickham (1890–1957), British Conservative politician
 Enoch Tanner Wickham (1883–1970), American folk artist
 Florence Wickham (1880–1962), American operatic contralto
 Geoffrey Wickham (born 1933), Australian pioneer of cardiac pacemaking, co-founder of Telectronics
 Glynne Wickham (1922–2004), British Shakespearean and theatre scholar
 Hadley Wickham, New Zealand statistician
 Henry Wickham (explorer) (1846–1928), British explorer
 Henry Wickham Wickham (1800–1876), British Conservative politician
 Joe Wickham (1890–1968), former General Secretary of the Football Association of Ireland
 John Wickham (attorney) (1736–1839), American attorney
 John Adams Wickham, Jr. (born 1928), U.S. Army Chief of Staff (1983–87)
 John Clements Wickham (1798–1864), Australian naval officer on Darwin's HMS Beagle, judge in Queensland
 Joseph Wickham (disambiguation)
 Keith Wickham (born 1965), British voice actor
 Kevin Wickham (1939–2020), Australian rower
 Louis Frédéric Wickham (1861–1913), French physician and pathologist
 Madeleine Wickham (born 1969), British bestselling author of chick lit as Sophie Kinsella
 Nick Wickham, British film and television director
 Parker Wickham (1727–1785), New York Loyalist politician
 Phil Wickham (born 1984), American Christian musician
 Reginald Wickham (1871–1952), English cricketer
 Saskia Wickham (born 1967), British actress
 Steve Wickham, Irish musician
 Ted Wickham (1911–1994), Bishop of Middleton from 1959 to 1982
 Tracey Wickham (born 1962), Australian swimmer
 Vicki Wickham  (born 1939), English talent manager
 Vincent Schofield Wickham (1894–1968), Editorial artist, sculptor
 William Wickham (bishop) (1539–1595), English bishop
 William Wickham (1761–1840), British politician
 William H. Wickham (1832–1893), mayor of New York (1875–76)
 Williams Carter Wickham (1820–1888), Confederate Brigadier General and Virginian politician

Other uses
 Wickham A Bluebird, a home-built aircraft
 Wickhams (department store) (now closed), in London
 Wickham trolley, a railway engineering personnel carrier
 Wickham striae, a skin condition named after Louis Frédéric Wickham

See also 
 Wickham railway station (disambiguation)
 Wicken (disambiguation)
 Grevillea wickhamii, an Australian plant also known as Wickham's Grevillea
 Whickham, Tyne and Wear, England
 Wykeham (disambiguation)